Schefflera violea is a species of flowering plant in the family Araliaceae. It is endemic to Vietnam.

References

violea
Flora of Vietnam